Dimitrios Orfanos (born November 2, 1982) is a retired Greek professional footballer.

Career
Born in Marousi, Orfanos began playing football with PAOK.
He played for several clubs before returning to PAOK in 2007 for one season. He retired from football in 2014.

He is the son of former Greek international player and fellow PAOK-player Kostas.

Honours

Greek Cup 2000-01

External links
Guardian Football
Profile at Onsports.gr

1982 births
Living people
Super League Greece players
PAOK FC players
Panserraikos F.C. players
Kavala F.C. players
Apollon Pontou FC players
Ergotelis F.C. players
Association football midfielders
Footballers from Athens
Greek footballers